Macrococculus is a monotypic genus of flowering plants belonging to the family Menispermaceae. The only species is Macrococculus pomifer.

Its native range is Papuasia.

References

Menispermaceae
Menispermaceae genera
Monotypic Ranunculales genera